85th NYFCC Awards
January 7, 2020

Best Picture: 
The Irishman

The 84th New York Film Critics Circle Awards, honoring the best in film for 2019, were announced on December 4, 2019.

Winners
Best Film
The Irishman

Best Director
Josh and Benny Safdie – Uncut Gems

Best Actor
Antonio Banderas – Pain and Glory

Best Actress
Lupita Nyong'o – Us

Best Supporting Actor
Joe Pesci – The Irishman

Best Supporting Actress
Laura Dern – Marriage Story & Little Women

Best Screenplay
Quentin Tarantino – Once Upon a Time in Hollywood

Best Animated Film
I Lost My Body

Best Cinematography
Claire Mathon – Portrait of a Lady on Fire

Best Non-Fiction Film
Honeyland

Best Foreign Language Film
Parasite • South Korea

Best First Film
Mati Diop – Atlantics

References

External links
 

New York Film Critics Circle Awards
New York
2019 in American cinema
New
2019 in New York City